Alayeluwa Oba Okunade Sijuwade, or Sijuade, (1 January 1930 – 28 July 2015) was the fiftieth traditional ruler or Ooni of Ife from 1980 to his death in 2015, taking the regnal name Olubuse II.
Ife is a traditional Yoruba state based in the town of Ife in Osun State, Nigeria.
He was crowned on 6 December 1980 in a ceremony attended by the Emir of Kano, Oba of Benin, Amayanabo of Opobo and Olu of Warri, as well as by representatives of the Queen of England.

Background

Sijuwade was born on 1 January 1930 in Ile-Ife to the Ogboru ruling house, grandson of the Ooni Sijuwade Adelekan Olubuse I.
He studied at Abeokuta Grammar School and Oduduwa College in Ile-Ife.
He worked for three years in his father's business, then for two years with the Nigerian Tribune, before attending Northampton College in the United Kingdom to study business management.
By the age of 30 he was a manager in Leventis, a Greek-Nigerian conglomerate.
In 1963 he became Sales Director of the state-owned National Motor in Lagos.
After spotting a business opportunity during a 1964 visit to the Soviet Union, he formed a company to distribute Soviet-built vehicles and equipment in Nigeria, which became the nucleus of a widespread business empire.
He also invested in real estate in his home town of Ile Ife.
By the time Sijuwade was crowned Ooni in 1980 he had become a wealthy man.

Sijuwade is a Christian. In November 2009 he attended the annual general meeting of the Foursquare Gospel Church in Nigeria accompanied by 17 other traditional rulers. He declared that he was a full member of the church, and said all the monarchs who accompanied him would now become members.
At his birthday celebration two months later, the Primate of the Anglican Communion described Sijuwade as "a humble monarch, who has the fear of God at heart".

Supremacy disputes

When Sijuwade became Ooni of Ife in December 1980 he inherited an ongoing dispute over supremacy between the obas of Yorubaland.
In 1967 a crisis had been resolved when Chief Obafemi Awolowo was chosen as the leader of the Yoruba.
In 1976 the Governor of Oyo State, General David Jemibewon, had decreed that the Ooni of Ife would be the permanent chairman of the State Council of Obas and Chiefs. Other Obas led by the Alaafin of Oyo, Oba Lamidi Adeyemi said the position should rotate.
The dispute calmed down when Osun State was carved out of Oyo State in August 1991, but ill will persisted.
In January 2009 Sijuwade was quoted as saying that Oba Adeyemi was ruling a dead empire (the Oyo Empire, which collapsed in 1793).
Adeyemi responded by citing "absurdities" in Sijuwade's statements and saying the Ooni "is not in tune with his own history".
Adeyemi, Permanent Chairman of the Oyo State Council of Obas and Chiefs, was conspicuously absent from a meeting of Yoruba leaders in April 2010.

Towards the end of 2009 a more local dispute between the Ooni, the Awujale of Ijebuland and the Alake of Egbaland was finally resolved. Sijuwade traced the dispute back to a falling out between Obafemi Awolowo and Ladoke Akintola during the Nigerian First Republic, which had led to a division between the traditional rulers. He noted that the traditional rulers were an important unifying force in the country during the illness of President Umaru Yar'Adua.

In February 2009, Sijuwade helped mediate in a dispute over land ownership between the communities of Ife and Modakeke, resolved in part through the elevation of the Ogunsua of Modakeke as an Oba.
The new Oba, Francis Adedoyin, would be under the headship of Sijuwade.

Political activities

In July 2009, Sijuwade said he was concerned that Yoruba socio-cultural groups such as Afenifere and the Yoruba Council of Elders were taking partisan positions in politics.
In January 2010 he attended a meeting of the Atayese pan-Yoruba group, which issued a call for a truly federal constitution in which the different nationalities in Nigeria would have greater independence in managing their affairs.
Celebrating his 80th birthday in January 2010, Sijuwade conferred Chieftainship titles on a number of politicians and their wives, including Imo State governor Ikedi Ohakim, Oyo State governor Otunba Adebayo Alao-Akala, Niger State governor Babangida Aliyu, Abia State governor Theodore Orji, Senators Jubril Aminu and Iyabo Obasanjo-Bello and others. Guests at the ceremony included former Nigerian President Olusegun Obasanjo, president of the Republic of Benin Dr Thomas Boni Yayi and King Otumfuo Osei Tutu II, the Asantehene of Kumasi, Ghana.
When Peter Obi, controversial governor of Anambra State, was reelected on 7 February 2010, Sijuwade congratulated him, saying his victory was the will of God.

In August 2010 he mediated in the ownership dispute between Oyo and Osun states concerning Ladoke Akintola University, calling a meeting attended by Prince Olagunsoye Oyinlola, governor of Osun State, Otunba Adebayo Alao-Akala, governor of Oyo State and the Permanent Secretary of the Federal Ministry of Education which resulted in an action plan.

Sijuwade and Governor Oyinlola were said to have the power to decide who became the next Osun State governor. 
In February 2010 Sijuwade and 16 other traditional rulers endorsed Senator Iyiola Omisore as candidate for Osun State governor in the 2011 elections.
Later there were allegations that Senator Omisore had fallen out with Sijuwade due to his failure to maintain support for Omisore's bid to become governor. Omisore denied the allegations, saying that the relationship was cordial and that "Ooni is our king and we should preserve and respect him as well".
In June 2010 Sijuwade and other traditional rulers endorsed the candidature of Fatai Akinade Akinbade for governor.

Awards and honors
 Commander of the Federal Republic of Nigeria (CFR)
 Keeper of the Seal of Yorubaland
 Hon. Chancellor, Bayero University, Kano, Nigeria
 Hon. Chancellor, Osun state University, Osogbo, Osun State, Nigeria
 Former Hon. Chancellor, University of Technology, Uyo, Akwa-Ibom State, Nigeria
 Doctor of Civil Laws (Honoris Causa), Obafemi Awolowo University, Ile-Ife, Osun State, Nigeria
 Doctor of Literature (Honoris Causa), University of Uyo, Akwa-Ibom State, Nigeria
 Doctor of Science (Honoris Causa), University of Lagos, Lagos State, Nigeria
 Member of the British Institute of Management
 Highest National Honour, Republic of Poland
 Royal Belgian Distinction of Commander in the Order of the Crown
 Grand Commodore, Ohio State, USA
 Carrier of the Key to the City of Columbia, USA
 Carrier of the Key to the City of Philadelphia, USA
 Carrier of the Key to the City of Port of Spain, Trinidad & Tobago
 Carrier of the Key to the City of Havana, Cuba

Death controversy
He was reported dead on 28 July 2015 in a London hospital at the age of 85 but the news was refuted by the Royal traditional council of Ile Ife who claimed that he is alive and in good health. His death away was officially announced by the Ife High Chiefs when they visited the governor of Osun State in Nigeria, Rauf Aregbesola, on 12 August 2015 at the governor's office in the state capital, Osogbo.
The Nigerian President Muhammadu Buhari expressed condolences to his family on his death.

He is the first Arole Oduduwa to die outside of Yorubaland.  The title of Adimula of Ife is spiritual, and is not befitting for an Ooni to depart beyond Yoruba boundaries.

See also
List of rulers of Ife

References

1930 births
Oonis of Ife
People from Ife
2015 deaths
Deaths in England
People named in the Panama Papers
People from Osun
People educated at Abeokuta Grammar School